The yellow-cheeked becard (Pachyramphus xanthogenys) is a passerine bird in the family Tityridae. It is treated variously as a distinct species or as a subspecies of the green-backed becard, Pachyramphus viridis. It has traditionally been placed in Cotingidae or Tyrannidae, but evidence strongly suggest it is better placed in Tityridae, where now placed by the South American Classification Committee. It is mainly found in Ecuador and Peru.

Its natural habitats are subtropical or tropical moist lowland forests and subtropical or tropical moist montane forests.

There are two subspecies:
 Pachyramphus xanthogenys xanthogenys Salvadori & Festa, 1898 – south Colombia, east Ecuador
 Pachyramphus xanthogenys peruanus Hartert & Goodson, 1917 – central Peru

References

BioLib

yellow-cheeked becard
Birds of the Ecuadorian Andes
Birds of the Peruvian Andes
yellow-cheeked becard